Sara Paxton (born April 25, 1988) is an American actress, voice artist, and singer. She began acting at an early age, appearing in minor roles in both films and television shows, before rising to fame in 2004, after playing the title role in the television series Darcy's Wild Life (2004-2006) and Sarah Borden in Summerland (2004). Paxton's other films include Aquamarine (2006), Return to Halloweentown (2006), Sydney White (2007), Superhero Movie (2008), The Innkeepers (2011) and The Front Runner (2018).

Early life
Paxton was born in Woodland Hills, Los Angeles, California, as the only child of Lucia ( Menchaca Zuckerman) and Steve Paxton. Her mother, Lucia, was born to a Jewish family in Monterrey, Mexico and raised in the city of Ciudad Acuña. Paxton's father is of English and Scottish descent, and he converted to Judaism upon marrying her mother. Both her parents are dentists. Paxton did not have a bat mitzvah because of her filming schedule.

Paxton was raised in the San Fernando Valley. She graduated from El Camino Real High School in June 2006.

In a 2009 interview with TeenHollywood, Paxton indicated that she had been accepted to several colleges, but decided not to attend any schools in favor of her acting career.

Career

1997-2004: Early roles
Paxton has said that singing and acting "went hand in hand" during her early years, though she initially began working as an actress, appearing in musical theater and later in television commercials at a young age. Her first film role was a small role in the 1997 comedy film Liar Liar. During the late 1990s and early 2000s, she appeared in a number of television and film roles, including voice roles in 15 episodes of the Nickelodeon animated series SpongeBob SquarePants, a role on the soap opera Passions, regular roles on the series Greetings from Tucson and Action and a guest starring role on Disney Channel's Lizzie McGuire playing Holly, an ex-president of Lizzie's school.

In 2003, Paxton starred in R. L. Stine's Haunted Lighthouse, a short 3D film attraction that still plays at several theme parks across the United States. That same year, she appeared as Lana Walker on the CSI: Miami season two episode "Death Grip." Paxton's first major role was in the teen film Sleepover, which opened in July 2004 to negative reviews and low box-office revenue. During that same summer season, she appeared in several episodes of Summerland, playing Sarah Borden, a mentally troubled teen who experimented with drugs and sex with Jesse McCartney's character.

Paxton was subsequently cast in the lead role of the Discovery Kids television series, Darcy's Wild Life playing Darcy Fields, a girl who works at a rural veterinary; the series was filmed on a farm in Toronto and aired from 2004-2006, often featuring Paxton's song, "Take a Walk". She received an Emmy nomination for the role in 2006.

2005-2012: Mainstream recognition

In 2005, Paxton spent three months working on the Florida-themed Aquamarine, in which she played the title character as a mermaid, opposite Emma Roberts and JoJo, whom she befriended while filming. Paxton has said that she felt a sense of "female empowerment" while on set because "almost everyone" on set was female. The film opened on March 3, 2006 and grossed approximately $7.5 million in its opening weekend. Reviewers of the film compared Paxton, whose inspiration is Goldie Hawn, to actress Reese Witherspoon, saying that she has an "infectious, nutty energy." Paxton recorded a song for the film's soundtrack titled "Connected," an English version of the Mexican group RBD's song Tenerte y Quererte from their 2004 album Rebelde. Paxton was signed to a record deal with Epic Records during the time she was cast in Aquamarine. Her debut music CD, The Ups and Downs, featuring the titled single "Here We Go Again," was due for release by Epic at some point "in the future"; as of March 2007, Paxton has not completed work on it, and it was presumably shelved.

Paxton hosted The Secret Life of Water, the first episode of the series Planet H2O, which premiered in April 2006 on public television stations. The following month, shortly after turning 18, she made an appearance on the television series Pepper Dennis, playing a teen actress. Paxton then appeared in Return to Halloweentown, replacing Kimberly J. Brown in the fourth installment in Disney Channel's Halloweentown series; she dyed her hair brown for the role. The film aired on October 20, 2006.

During the summer and early fall of 2006, Paxton filmed The Party Never Stops: Diary of a Binge Drinker, a Lifetime Television film, on Vancouver Island. In the film, she plays Jessie, a college student who falls victim to binge drinking. Paxton described it as "very different" from her previous roles and has specified that she was looking for a role that would be a "challenge". The film aired in March 2007.

Paxton's next film role was in Sydney White, a college-set comedy starring Amanda Bynes and Matt Long; filming began on February 12, 2007 in Orlando, Florida and the movie was released on September 21, 2007. She next starred in Superhero Movie, a parody on superhero films which began filming in September 2007 and was released on March 28, 2008. She provided backing vocals on her co-star Drake Bell's theme song for the movie Superhero! Song.

Paxton starred in the remake of The Last House on the Left, playing the lead female character, Mari. The film was released on March 13, 2009.

2013-present: Television roles and film

Paxton starred in the CW drama series The Beautiful Life alongside Corbin Bleu, Mischa Barton and Elle Macpherson. The show premiered on September 16, 2009, but was cancelled after just two episodes. It later aired online on YouTube.

Paxton next co-starred with Scott Eastwood in the thriller Enter Nowhere, and also played one of the lead roles in the Ti West film The Innkeepers.

Paxton starred in the 2011 movie Shark Night. She then played Mirabella on the ABC Family movie Lovestruck: The Musical in 2013.

In April 2016, it was announced that Paxton had joined the cast of David Lynch's 2017 Twin Peaks revival.

In 2018, she co-starred as Donna Rice opposite Hugh Jackman in Jason Reitman's The Front Runner, a biographical film about politician Gary Hart.

In 2018-2019, she played Amber Dooley in the NBC series Good Girls.

Paxton has a supporting role in Andrew Dominik’s Blonde (2022), based on the biographical fiction novel of the same name by Joyce Carol Oates. The film is a fictionalized take on the life and career of actress Marilyn Monroe.

Personal life
In 2013, Paxton met Zach Cregger in Austin, Texas. They married in October 2019.

Filmography

Film

Television

Video game

Discography

Soundtrack appearances
Source:

Awards and nominations

References

External links

Living people
20th-century American actresses
21st-century American actresses
Actresses from Los Angeles
American actresses of Mexican descent
American Ashkenazi Jews
American child actresses
American film actresses
American musicians of Mexican descent
American people of English descent
American people of Irish descent
American people of Mexican-Jewish descent
American people of Scottish descent
American television actresses
American voice actresses
El Camino Real High School alumni
Hispanic and Latino American actresses
Hispanic and Latino American musicians
Hispanic and Latino American women singers
Jewish American actresses
Jewish American musicians
Jewish rock musicians
Jewish women singers
People from Woodland Hills, Los Angeles
Singers from California
21st-century American singers
21st-century American women singers
21st-century American Jews
1988 births